Amber Bracken (born 1984) is a Canadian photojournalist known for her reporting on issues affecting Indigenous peoples in North America.

She won a World Press Photo first prize in 2017 for Contemporary Issues and in 2022 won the overall World Press Photo of the Year.

She was arrested in 2021 while covering the 2020 Canadian pipeline and railway protests.

Early life and education 
Bracken is from Edmonton, Alberta. She obtained a diploma in photojournalism from Southern Alberta Institute of Technology in 2008.

Career 
Bracken's career started at the Edmonton Sun before she left to work freelance.

Her work featured in the Creative Endeavors exhibit in the Art Gallery of St. Albert in 2017. Her pictures have been published by outlets including The New York Times and Al Jazeera.

She also writes for the New York Times and other media on the plight of the Canadian indigenous peoples.

Bracken was arrested in 2021 while freelancing for The Narwhal and reporting on the 2020 Canadian pipeline and railway protests. She was released on bail soon after. Civil contempt charges were dropped by Coastal GasLink.

Her reporting on the Dakota Access Pipeline protests won her a World Press Photo first prize for contemporary issues in 2017. In 2022, Bracken was awarded a World Press Photo of the Year for her photo of Kamloops Residential School which appeared in The New York Times in 2021.

Personal life 
Bracken lives in Edmonton.

References

External links 
 
 World Press Photo Award 2022 winning photo

Canadian photojournalists
Living people
People from Edmonton
Southern Alberta Institute of Technology alumni
Canadian women photographers
1984 births
Women photojournalists
The Narwhal people